Mizuho Dam  is a rockfill dam located in Hokkaido Prefecture in Japan. The dam is used for irrigation. The catchment area of the dam is 12.2 km2. The dam impounds about 56  ha of land when full and can store 4300 thousand cubic meters of water. The construction of the dam was started on 1982 and completed in 1998.

References

Dams in Hokkaido